

Composition

2005-2007:

2007-2009:

Floor Leadership
Majority Leader: H. Truman Chafin
Majority Whip: Billy Wayne Bailey
Minority Leader: Vic Sprouse
Minority Whip: Andy McKenzie

Committees
At the start each new Legislature, standing committees are appointed. The Senate President selects the chairpersons. The Rules of the Senate call for the following committees to be formed:
Agriculture (11 members) - Larry J. Edgell, Chairman
Banking and Insurance (14 members) - Joseph M. Minard, Chairman
Confirmations (9 members) - Shirley Love, Chairman
Economic Development (14 members) - Brooks McCabe, Chairman
Education (14 members) - Robert H. Plymale, Chairman
Energy, Industry and Mining (14 members) - William R. Sharpe, Jr., Chairman
Finance (17 members) - Walt Helmick, Chairman
Government Organization (14 members) - Edwin Bowman, Chairman
Health and Human Resources (14 members) - Roman W. Prezioso, Jr., Chairman
Interstate Cooperation (7 members) - Evan H. Jenkins, chairman; (Senate President is ex officio co-chairperson)
Judiciary (17 members) - Jeffrey V. Kessler, Chairman
Labor (11 members) - Michael Oliverio II, Chairman
Military (9 members) - Jon Blair Hunter, Chairman
Natural Resources (14 members) - John Pat Fanning, Chairman
Pensions (7 members) - Dan Foster, Chairman
Rules (11 members) - Earl Ray Tomblin, Ex officio Chairman as Senate President
Transportation and Infrastructure (9 members) - John Unger II, Chairman

See also

External links
Senate President Earl Ray Tomblin
West Virginia Legislature - official website

Politics of West Virginia